The 2006–07 Eastern Kentucky Colonels basketball team represented Eastern Kentucky University during the 2006–07 NCAA Division I men's basketball season. The Colonels, led by second-year head coach Jeff Neubauer, played their home games at McBrayer Arena within Alumni Coliseum and were members of the East Division of the Ohio Valley Conference. They finished the season 21–12, 13–7 in OVC play to finish in second place. They were champions of the OVC tournament to earn an automatic bid to the NCAA tournament where they lost in the opening round to No. 1 seed North Carolina.

Roster

Schedule and results

|-
!colspan=9 style=| Regular season

|-
!colspan=9 style=| Ohio Valley Conference tournament

|-
!colspan=9 style=| NCAA tournament

References

Eastern Kentucky Colonels men's basketball seasons
Eastern Kentucky
Eastern Kentucky